Wompatuck (ca. 1627 - 1669), also spelled Wampatuck, was sachem, or paramount chief, of the Mattakeesett band of Massachusett Indians.

Names 
Wompatuck was also known as Wampatuck, Josias Wampatuck, and Josiah Sagamore. Wampatuck translates to mean "snow goose" in the Wampanoag language.

Family 
Wampatuck's father was the sachem Chikataubut. After Chikataubut died of smallpox in 1633, Wompatuck's uncle, Cutshamekin succeeded as sachem and helped to raise Wompatuck.

Career 
After Cutshamekin died around 1655, Wompatuck succeeded him and likewise became an early Native American ally of British colonists. Like his father and uncle, he sold the British colonists the land upon which the city of Boston, Massachusetts, was established in 1629 and other surrounding towns were established.

After a harsh attack on his tribe by the Haudenosaunee (or Iroquois) in 1665, Wompatuck organized a great retaliatory expedition, involving several Massachusett tribes with 600 or 700 warriors, against Mohawk's capital, Gandaouaguè. Returning to Massachusetts, his column was ambushed and he was slain in 1669 when he led a force of his warriors in an attack upon the Mohawks. Wompatuck's son, Charles Josias Wampatuck, became sachem after his death.

Namesakes
Two United States Navy ships – the armed tug , in commission from 1898 to 1931, and the harbor tug , later YTB-337, in commission from 1942 to 1946 – have been named for Wompatuck.

Wompatuck State Park located in Hingham, Massachusetts is also named after Wompatuck.

Notes

References

Department of the Navy Naval Historical Center Dictionary of American Naval Fighting Ships Wampatuck (ship namesake paragraph)

Native American leaders
1669 deaths
Date of death missing
Massachusett people
Native American history of Massachusetts
Native American people from Massachusetts
1620s births
Date of birth unknown